Stanislav Ivanov may refer to:

 Stanislav Ivanov (footballer, born 1980), Moldovan football player
 Stanislav Ivanov (footballer, born 1999), Bulgarian football player